Samariscus is a genus of crested flounders native to the Indo-Pacific.

Species
Twenty recognized species are in this genus:
 Samariscus asanoi Ochiai & Amaoka, 1962
 Samariscus corallinus Gilbert, 1905 (coralline-red flounder)
 Samariscus desoutterae Quéro, Hensley & Maugé, 1989
 Samariscus filipectoralis S. C. Shen, 1982
 Samariscus hexaradiatus Díaz de Astarloa, Causse & Pruvost, 2014 
 Samariscus huysmani Weber, 1913 (Huysman's righteye flounder)
 Samariscus inornatus (Lloyd, 1909)
 Samariscus japonicus Kamohara, 1936
 Samariscus latus Matsubara & Takamuki, 1951 (deep-body righteye flounder)
 Samariscus leopardus Voronina, 2009
 Samariscus longimanus Norman, 1927 (longfinned flounder)
 Samariscus luzonensis Fowler, 1934 (Luzon righteye flounder)
 Samariscus macrognathus Fowler, 1934 (large-mouth righteye flounder)
 Samariscus maculatus (Günther, 1880) (spotted righteye flounder)
 Samariscus multiradiatus Kawai, Amaoka & Séret, 2008
 Samariscus neocaledonia Kawai, Amaoka & Séret, 2011 (New Caledonian righteye flounder)
 Samariscus nielseni Quéro, Hensley & Maugé, 1989 (Nielsen's righteye flounder)
 Samariscus sunieri Weber & de Beaufort, 1929 (Sunier's righteye flounder)
 Samariscus triocellatus Woods, 1960 (three-spot righteye flounder)
 Samariscus xenicus Ochiai & Amaoka, 1962

References

Samaridae
Marine fish genera
Taxa named by Charles Henry Gilbert